Diedougou may refer to:

 Diédougou, Dioïla, a commune of the Dioïla Cercle in the Koulikoro Region of Mali
 Diédougou, Kati, a commune of the Kati Cercle in the Koulikoro Region of Mali
 Diédougou, Sikasso, a commune of the Koutiala Cercle in the Sikasso Region of Mali
 Diédougou, Ségou, a commune of the Ségou Cercle in the Ségou Region of Mali